In enzymology, a 2-dehydropantoate 2-reductase is an enzyme that catalyzes the chemical reaction

(R)-pantoate + NADP+  2-dehydropantoate + NADPH + H+

Thus, the two substrates of this enzyme are (R)-pantoate and NADP+, whereas its 3 products are 2-dehydropantoate, NADPH, and H+.

This enzyme belongs to the family of oxidoreductases, specifically those acting on the CH-OH group of donor with NAD+ or NADP+ as acceptor. The systematic name of this enzyme class is (R)-pantoate:NADP+ 2-oxidoreductase. Other names in common use include 2-oxopantoate reductase, 2-ketopantoate reductase, 2-ketopantoic acid reductase, ketopantoate reductase, and ketopantoic acid reductase. This enzyme participates in pantothenate and coa biosynthesis.

Structural studies

References

 

EC 1.1.1
NADPH-dependent enzymes
Enzymes of known structure